Zharrëz is a village and a former municipality in the Fier County, southwestern Albania. At the 2015 local government reform it became a subdivision of the municipality Patos. In February 2017, in Zharrez there was a hunger strike, Because the houses of residents were destroyed and they wanted payment. The strike was closed by Niko Peleshi. The population at the 2011 census was 5,236.

References

Former municipalities in Fier County
Administrative units of Patos (municipality)
Villages in Fier County